Kim Pearson (born October 18, 1962) is a former Republican Iowa State Representative from the 42nd District.  She served one term in the Iowa House of Representatives from 2011 to 2013. She was born in Nebraska and raised in Iowa.

Pearson served on several committees in the Iowa House — the Education, Education Oversight, Education Oversight (Joint), Human Resources, and Transportation committees. She also served as the vice chair of the Judiciary Committee.

In 2011, she endorsed Republican presidential candidate Ron Paul.

Electoral history
*incumbent

References

External links

Representative Kim Pearson official Iowa General Assembly site
Kim Pearson Iowa House official campaign site
 

Living people
Republican Party members of the Iowa House of Representatives
Women state legislators in Iowa
People from Polk County, Iowa
1962 births
21st-century American women